The  is a Japanese short-necked wooden lute traditionally used in narrative storytelling. The  is a plucked string instrument that first gained popularity in China before spreading throughout East Asia, eventually reaching Japan sometime during the Nara period (710–794).

In spite of its popularity, the Ōnin War and subsequent Warring States Period disrupted  teaching and decreased the number of proficient users.

History
The  arrived in Japan in the 7th century, having evolved from the Chinese bent-neck , while the  itself was derived from similar instruments in West Asia.

However, following the collapse of the Ritsuryō state,  employed at the court were faced with the court's reconstruction and sought asylum in Buddhist temples.

Through the next several centuries, players of both traditions intersected frequently and developed new music styles and new instruments.

The  was used by Buddhist monks visiting private residences to perform memorial services, not only for Buddhist rites, but also to accompany the telling of stories and news.

Of the remaining post-war  traditions, only  remains a style almost solely performed by blind persons.

By the middle of the Meiji period, improvements had been made to the instruments and easily understandable songs were composed in quantity.

However, the playing of the  nearly became extinct during the Meiji period following the introduction of Western music and instruments, until players such as Tsuruta Kinshi and others revitalized the genre with modern playing styles and collaborations with Western composers.

Types
As the  does not play in tempered tuning, pitches are approximated to the nearest note.

Classic

Its plectrum is small and thin, often rounded, and made from a hard material such as boxwood or ivory. It is not used to accompany singing.

It is assumed that the performance traditions died out by the 10th or 11th century (William P. Malm). This instrument also disappeared in the Chinese court orchestras. Recently, this instrument, much like the  harp, has been revived for historically informed performances and historical reconstructions.

Its plectrum varies in both size and materials. The four fret type is tuned to E, B, E and A, and the five fret type is tuned to B, e, f and f. The six fret type is tuned to B, E, B and b.

Middle and Edo

It was originally used by traveling  minstrels, and its small size lent it to indoor play and improved portability. Its tuning is A, c, e, a or A, c-sharp, e, a.

Modern  used for contemporary compositions often have five or more frets, and some have a doubled fourth string. Its size and construction influences the sound of the instrument as the curved body is often struck percussively with the plectrum during play.

The  is traditionally made from Japanese mulberry, although other hard woods such as Japanese zelkova are sometimes used in its construction. Due to the slow growth of the Japanese mulberry, the wood must be taken from a tree at least 120 years old and dried for 10 years before construction can begin.

The strings are made of wound silk. Its tuning is A, E, A, B, for traditional , G, G, c, g, or G, G, d, g for contemporary compositions, among other tunings, but these are only examples as the instrument is tuned to match the key of the player's voice. The first and second strings are generally tuned to the same note, with the 4th (or doubled 4th) string is tuned one octave higher.

This  often has five strings (although it is essentially a 4-string instrument as the 5th string is a doubled 4th that are always played together) and five or more frets, and the construction of the tuning head and frets vary slightly. Ueda Junko and Tanaka Yukio, two of Tsuruta's students, continue the tradition of the modern .

These works present a radical departure from the compositional languages usually employed for such an instrument.

Modern

Most contemporary performers use the five string version. The plectrum is usually made from rosewood with boxwood or ivory tips for plucking the strings. The instrument itself also varies in size, depending on the player. Male players typically play  that are slightly wider and/or longer than those used by women or children. The body of the instrument is never struck with the plectrum during play, and the five string instrument is played upright, while the four string is played held on its side. The instrument is tuned to match the key of the singer. An example tuning of the four string version is B, e, f and b, and the five string instrument can be tuned to C, G, C, d and g. For the five string version, the first and third strings are tuned the same note, the second string three steps down, the fifth string an octave higher than the second string, and the fourth string a step down from the fifth. So the previously mentioned tuning can be tuned down to B, F, B, c, d. Popularly used by female  players such as Uehara Mari.

The , a modern  with five strings and five frets, was popularised by the 20th-century  player and composer . Its tuning is C, G, c, g, g.

Styles of  music
The , considered one of Japan's principal traditional instruments, has both influenced and been influenced by other traditional instruments and compositions throughout its long history; as such, a number of different musical styles played with the  exist.

 : In , musical instruments usually serve as accompaniments to vocal performances, which dominate the musical style, with the overwhelming majority of  compositions being vocal.
 :  was usually patronized by the imperial court or the shrines and temples.  ensembles were composed of string, wind, and percussion instruments, where string and wind instruments were more respected and percussion instruments were considered lesser instruments. Among the string instruments, the  seems to have been the most important instrument in orchestral  performances.
Before arriving in Japan,  was used in Indian Buddhism.

construction and tuning
Generally speaking,  have four strings, though modern  and  may have five strings. The varying string thickness creates different timbres when stroked from different directions.

In , tuning is not fixed. General tones and pitches can fluctuate up or down entire steps or microtones. When singing in a chorus,  singers often stagger their entry and often sing through non-synchronized, heterophony accompaniment. In solo performances, a  performer sings monophonically, with melismatic emphasis throughout the performance. These monophonic do not follow a set harmony. Instead,  singers tend to sing with a flexible pitch without distinguishing soprano, alto, tenor, or bass roles. Since  pieces were generally performed for small groups, singers did not need to project their voices as opera singers did in Western music tradition.

 music is based on a pentatonic scale (sometimes referred to as a five-tone or five-note scale), meaning that each octave contains five notes. This scale sometimes includes supplementary notes, but the core remains pentatonic. The rhythm in  performances allows for a broad flexibility of pulse. Songs are not always metered, although more modern collaborations are metered. Notes played on the  usually begin slow and thin and progress through gradual accelerations, increasing and decreasing tempo throughout the performance. The texture of  singing is often described as "sparse".

The plectrum also contributes to the texture of  music. What the plectrum is made of also changes the texture, with ivory and plastic plectrums creating a more resilient texture to the wooden plectrum's twangy hum.

Use in modern music
 usage in Japan has declined greatly since the Heian period. As a result, younger musicians turned to other instruments and interest in  music decreased.

In 1868, the Tokugawa shogunate collapsed, giving way to the Meiji period and the Meiji Restoration, during which the samurai class was abolished, and the  lost their patronage.  players no longer enjoyed special privileges and were forced to support themselves. At the beginning of the Meiji period, it was estimated that there were at least one hundred traditional court musicians in Tokyo; however, by the 1930s, this number had reduced to just 46 in Tokyo, and a quarter of these musicians later died in World War II. Life in post-war Japan was difficult, and many musicians abandoned their music in favor of more sustainable livelihoods.

As  music declined in post-Pacific War Japan, many Japanese composers and musicians found ways to revitalize interest in it. They recognized that studies in music theory and music composition in Japan almost entirely consisted in Western theory and instruction. Beginning in the late 1960s, these musicians and composers began to incorporate Japanese music and Japanese instruments into their compositions; for example, one composer, Tōru Takemitsu, collaborated with Western composers and compositions to include the distinctly Asian .

Yamashika, born in the late Meiji period, continued the  tradition until his death in 1996. Beginning in the late 1960s to the late 1980s, composers and historians from all over the world visited Yamashika and recorded many of his songs; before this time, the  tradition had been a completely oral tradition. When Yamashika died in 1996, the era of the  tutelage died with him, but the music and genius of that era continues thanks to his recordings.

Recordings
 Silenziosa Luna –  / ALM Records ALCD-76 (2008).

Notes

References

See also
 History and evolution of the lute
 Lake Biwa

External links

 Introduction to the Hei-kyoku
 Picture of Biwa school about 1900

Japanese musical instruments
Necked bowl lutes
Sacred musical instruments
Japanese words and phrases